Fred Clifford Clarke (October 3, 1872 – August 14, 1960) was an American Major League Baseball player from 1894 to  and manager from 1897 to 1915. A Hall of Famer, Clarke played for and managed both the Louisville Colonels and Pittsburgh Pirates. He was a left fielder and left-handed batter.

Of the nine pennants in Pittsburgh franchise history, Clarke was the player-manager for four of them. He and fellow Hall of Famers Honus Wagner and Vic Willis led Pittsburgh to a victory over Ty Cobb and the Detroit Tigers in the 1909 World Series. Clarke batted over .300 in 11 different seasons. His 35-game hitting streak in 1895 was the second-longest in Major League history at the time. For six years, Clarke held the Major League record for wins by a manager.

Early life and career
Fred Clarke was born on a farm near Winterset, Iowa. At age two, his family moved as part of a covered wagon caravan from Iowa to Kansas before relocating to Des Moines, Iowa, five years later.  As a child in Des Moines, Clarke sold newspapers for the Iowa State Register where his boss was future Baseball Hall of Fame member, Ed Barrow. In 1892, a professional team in Hastings, Nebraska sent a railroad ticket to Des Moines semiprofessional player Byron McKibbon, but McKibbon backed out and gave the ticket to Clarke instead.  Clarke impressed the Hastings team and he signed his first professional contract.  He was in the Southern League at age 21 and played for teams in Montgomery, Alabama, and Savannah, Georgia.

Clarke was discovered in the minor leagues by Louisville part-owner, Barney Dreyfuss, and joined the Colonels in 1894. In his first game, he collected five hits in five at bats which is still a Major League record. In his second season, he asserted himself with a batting average of .347, 191 hits and 96 runs, which were all best on the team by far. In 1897, Clarke took over managerial duties while only 24 years old.  As a player, he hit a career-high .390.  Only the best average of Willie Keeler's career stopped Clarke from winning his only batting title.  (For many years, Clarke's 1897 average was listed as .406, but further research led most official sources, including MLB.com, to list it at .390.) Despite Clarke's excellent hitting and the presence of fellow Hall of Famers Honus Wagner and Rube Waddell, the team struggled for several years.  While in Louisville, Clarke was teamed up with pitcher Chick Fraser.  Clarke and Fraser became brothers-in-law when they married sisters. When the Colonels folded, Barney Dreyfuss became the owner of the Pittsburgh franchise and tapped Clarke, Wagner, Waddell, Deacon Phillippe, and others to accompany him.

Pittsburgh

In 1900, Clarke joined the Pittsburgh Pirates as a player and manager, roles he would embrace until his retirement in 1915.   was arguably the best hitting season of Clarke's career as he led the Major Leagues in slugging average and OPS and led the National League in doubles.  He finished second only to his teammate, Honus Wagner, for the National League batting title.  In the first World Series, Clarke hit .265 but Boston's Cy Young and Bill Dinneen outpitched Pittsburgh overall and won the series in eight games.

In the 1909 World Series, Clarke batted only .211 but hit both of Pittsburgh's home runs and had more home runs and RBI than any player on either team. Clarke also set a record for most walks for one player in a World Series game with four in Game 7.

On August 23, 1910, Clarke recorded four assists from the outfield in one game, tying a Major League record.  The following season, his last as a regular player, 38-year-old Clarke made 10 putouts in left field in one game on April 25, 1911. Clarke played just 12 more games after 1911, the last three as the oldest active player in the majors.

Clarke finished his career with a .312 batting average and is seventh on the all-time triples list with 220. He led his team to four National League pennants (1901, 1902, 1903 and 1909) and one World Series championship (1909). The 1902 Pirates lost only 36 games under Clarke's guidance, tying a modern-era record. In , Clarke passed Cap Anson and Frank Selee, giving him the Major League record for wins by a manager. In addition to the four pennants and one World Series, Clarke managed Pittsburgh to five second-place seasons, three third-place seasons, and two 100-win seasons.

After his playing days
After his managing days ended in 1915, Clarke returned to his "Little Pirate Ranch" near Winfield, Kansas, which he had purchased with a down payment during his first year in the majors.  He made a considerable fortune when oil was discovered on his property.  In 1924, he bought a minority stake in the Pirates and was named the team's vice president.  He was also allowed to sit in the dugout during games, making him manager Bill McKechnie's bench coach in all but name. The Pirates won the World Series the following year.

During the 1926 season, several players felt that Clarke was trying to undermine McKechnie and become manager once again.  When slumping veteran (and eventual Hall of Famer) Max Carey—one of only two members of the 1909 world champions still on the team—got word that Clarke tried to pressure McKechnie into benching him, Carey demanded that Clarke be removed from the bench.  He was supported by the other member of the 1909 team who was still on the roster, Babe Adams, as well as another veteran, Carson Bigbee. McKechnie initially appeared to side with Carey, Adams and Bigbee, but was forced to recant rather than risk appearing to criticize the front office.  A resolution calling for Clarke's removal from the bench only garnered the support of three other players.  Ownership struck fast and hard; on August 13, the Pirates released Adams and Bigbee, and waived Carey. They finished 84–69, third in the league behind the St. Louis Cardinals and the Cincinnati Reds, and McKechnie lost his job.

Fred Clarke was selected to the Baseball Hall of Fame in 1945 as one of the first to be elected by the Old-Timers Committee.  He was one of 24 original inductees into the Iowa Sports Hall of Fame in 1951. Clarke remained active and seemingly indestructible into his 70s.  In 1947, while fishing in northern Minnesota, he and his wife were thrown into icy northern Minnesota waters by a storm, but he was back out fishing the next day.  Soon after, he was nearly shot accidentally while quail hunting.  He then survived a gas furnace explosion in his basement. While in Winfield he started the Winfield Country Club that is still in operation to this day. Fred Clarke died in Winfield at age 87.

Hall of Fame voting

Managerial record

See also

 List of Major League Baseball annual doubles leaders
 List of Major League Baseball annual triples leaders
 List of Major League Baseball career hits leaders
 List of Major League Baseball career triples leaders
 List of Major League Baseball career runs scored leaders
 List of Major League Baseball career runs batted in leaders
 List of Major League Baseball career stolen bases leaders
 List of Major League Baseball player-managers
 List of Major League Baseball managers by wins
 List of Major League Baseball players to hit for the cycle

References

External links

1872 births
1960 deaths
People from Winterset, Iowa
National Baseball Hall of Fame inductees
Major League Baseball left fielders
Louisville Colonels players
Pittsburgh Pirates players
Major League Baseball player-managers
Louisville Colonels managers
Pittsburgh Pirates managers
Pittsburgh Pirates coaches
19th-century baseball players
Baseball players from Iowa
Minor league baseball managers
Montgomery Colts players
St. Joseph Saints players
Savannah Modocs players
Pittsburgh Filipinos players
World Series-winning managers